The Yellow Monkey, sometimes abbreviated as , is a Japanese rock band originally active from 1988 to 2001, before officially disbanding in 2004. They announced their reformation in 2016.

The band's name was derived from the ethnic slur that Japanese people look like monkeys, and that Asian people are said to be "yellow" in skin color. The Yellow Monkey is considered an important Japanese rock group, having achieved major success selling 10 million records, including 6.2 million singles. The group has had three consecutive number one albums, 18 top ten singles and in 2003 were ranked number 81 on HMV Japan's list of the 100 most important Japanese pop acts. Outside Japan the band is best known for their song "Tactics", one of the many ending themes of the Rurouni Kenshin anime.

History

1988–1994: The Beginning 
The group has its roots in 1988, formed by Kazuya Yoshii when his previous band Urgh Police disbanded. He, originally playing bass, switched to guitar when he recruited Yoichi Hirose (ex-Murbas), Eiji Kikuchi (ex-Killer May) and several other members and they began to play in the live houses of Tokyo. When the vocalist left, Yoshii took over that position and recruited Eiji's brother Hideaki as guitarist.

The Yellow Monkey started to play in the underground circuit, being well known for not only their latent songwriting quality, but also because of their live performances, which would soon become the main characteristics of the group. A December 28, 1989 show at Shibuya La Mama is regarded as the first with these four members. The fans of the band grew vertiginously, preparing the band for their first studio work.

In 1991, the band finally launched their first album, Bunched Birth, which had seven original songs. It was an independently released album with raw sonority, with many influences from hard rock, and containing well-shaped but peculiar lyrics (all of them written by Yoshii). The work was very well received by the public, opening the doors for their major label debut album, The Night Snails and Plastic Boogie, of 1992 on Triad/Nippon Columbia. The new album brought eleven songs more elaborate than the first work. The band had a considerable increase in popularity, which added to single "Romantist Taste" and to the ballad "Pearl Light of Revolution", that already gave samples of the potential of Kazuya in composing powerful ballads.

In 1993, the band launched their second major album, Experience Movie. The songs had a better production and care with the sonority. The songs of the album were very strong and with high emotional text. The band also started to be admired for their live performances, due to the band's charisma and Kazuya's extreme performances. However, the band had not yet become a large public success in Japan.

In 1994, they released the album Jaguar Hard Pain, a conceptual album which tells the saga of Jaguar, a World War II soldier who dies in combat and comes back to life trying to find his love, Mary. This was the last album from the first period of the band, when their songs did not have as much popular sound appeal.

1995–2000: The Success 
By the year 1995, The Yellow Monkey had already become successful in Japan, playing their first show at the Nippon Budokan on April 11. They released the album Smile, which was another critical and public success, and the band released the single "Love Communication". Other songs that became classics of the band are "Fantasy" (Nagekunari Waga Yoru no Fantasy), "Scorching Night" (Nettaiya), the powerful ballad "Hard Rain" and "Venus's Flower" (Venus no Hana). The tour for this album in Japan booked more than 40 major shows.

When it seemed that the band would rest, at the end of that same year, they released the album Four Seasons, which was recorded in London. The album reached No. 1 on the Oricon charts. The album had more-accessible songs, and reached a warm reception by the fans. There were also fans of anime because the song "Tactics" was used as the first ending theme of the Rurouni Kenshin anime, becoming their most successful single up until that point. Many other classics were already identified, such as "The Sun Is Burning" (Taiyō ga Moeteiru), the good rock-and-roll track "I Love You Baby" and songs such as "Father", "Remembering a Mermaid" (Tsuioku no Mermaid) and "The Moon Song" (Tsuki no Uta). Despite the thundering success of the record, the Yellow Monkey continued being a cult band, since the lyrics and live performances remained consistent. On May 5, 1996, The Yellow Monkey performed in London with The Spiders from Mars.

After two back-to-back record releases, the band decided to take a break for one year. The decision was aided by Kazuya's stress from the constant and exhausting work of the two previous albums. The compilation album Triad Years Act 1 was released and was certified by the RIAJ for sales of a million copies. They also changed record labels to BMG Funhouse/Ariola Japan and put on a special show, Mekara Uroko 7, at the end of the year. It was a concert for the oldest fans of the band, in which they had played older songs from before the Smile album. Many of these old fans considered those songs to be mainstream and pop in excess. An unforgettable part of this concert was the moment where they played "Pearl Light of Revolution" with an orchestral arrangement. This according to Kazuya, was one of the best moments in his career.

In 1997, The Yellow Monkey came back with the album that is considered their magnum opus, Sicks. This album brought a different sonority compared to the two previous works. It was a mix of their current sound combined with that of their first albums. Bringing more complex and mature songs, Sicks, was an amazing critical success and repeated the sales of the previous album. The main characteristic of the record is the concern of the band with the arrangements, which becomes more evident already in the first track, "Rainbow Man". The only single of the album was "Rakuen", which was successful and is still one of their best known songs. Despite being a concise album, whose songs are all equivalent in quality, there are three songs that made the album legendary. The first one is the already cited "Rakuen", with a strong chorus. "Rakuen" ("Paradise") was covered by Eric Martin, known as Mr. Big vocalist, in his album Mr. Rock Vocalist released in 2012. The second is the ballad "End of Life (for Grandmother)" (Jinsei no Owari  (for Grandmother)), considered by many as the best ballad by The Yellow Monkey. The third song is the long eight-minute epic, "Trip in Heaven" (Tengoku Ryokou), again considered among the best songs of the group.

The band released the commercially successful album Punch Drunkard in 1998, although not to the extent of their previous album it was named one of the top albums from 1989-1998 in a 2004 issue of the music magazine Band Yarouze. The songs "Kyūkon" ("Bulb"), "Burn", and "Love Love Show" easily became hits. Although containing accessible songs, such as the ones cited in this article, the album used the song-writing method of the previous album, Sicks. The success of the album made it possible for the band to begin a great tour with 113 live concerts, the most of their career. They also did a small tour in the United Kingdom.

After the exhausting succession of concerts and tours, the group took a one-year break. Coming back in 2000, the Yellow Monkey released their last studio album, 8. They released many singles such as "Holy Sea and Sunshine" (Seinaru Umi to Sunshine), "Pearl", "Rosy Days" (Barairo no Hibi) and "Shock Hearts", all of them achieving great success. The album is considered the most occidental of the band, which was common for all Japanese bands at that time. Despite the success of the album, the group did not stage many concerts that year, already showing that the end was coming.

2001–2004: The End and post-activities
On January 8, 2001 the group held their last concert at the Tokyo Dome, beginning a hiatus for an indefinite amount of time and released their last single "Primal." at the end of the month, which was produced by Tony Visconti. The compilation album Golden Years Singles 1996–2001 followed in June. The members released many solo albums, with Kazuya reaching more success and adopting the stage name of Yoshii Lovinson, which he abandoned some years later. Hirose also obtained relative success with his band, Heesey with Dudes. Annie teamed up with Anchang (Sex Machineguns) and Natchin (Siam Shade) to form the trio Big Bites. Hideaki formed the loose musical collaboration project brainchild's.

In 2004, the band released a large compilation Mother of All the Best, which included three discs with some singles, all b-sides, some demo-version songs and live performances. The Yellow Monkey officially announced their disbandment on July 7, 2004. However, the four members got together one last time for the final day of The Exhibition and Video Festival of The Yellow Monkey Mekara Uroko 15 held at the Tokyo Dome on December 26, 2004 and performed "Jam".

A two-disc tribute album titled This is For You ~ The Yellow Monkey Tribute Album was released on December 9, 2009, featuring artists such as Mucc, Fujifabric, 9mm Parabellum Bullet, Morgan Fisher and Kreva. Their song "Jam" was covered by Chemical Pictures on the album Crush! 2 -90's V-Rock Best Hit Cover Songs-, which was released on November 23, 2011.

In 2012, a remix of their first single was released in celebration of the 20th anniversary of their major label debut. Mastered by Ted Jensen, "Romantist Taste 2012" was released on October 10.

A documentary film of their 113 date tour from April 1998 to March 1999 was released in theaters nationwide in 2013, titled Pandora: The Yellow Monkey Punch Drunkard Tour The Movie. It includes an interview with all four members together, the first time since the band broke up.

2016–present: The Reformation

Rumors began circulating about the band reforming after the appearance of a mysterious website with a picture of a cocoon and a timer counting down to January 8, 2016. Various clues on the page led to the notion of the band reuniting, including GPS coordinates of the venue where they held their first concert. It was confirmed on January 8 that The Yellow Monkey would reform for a twenty-date arena tour, beginning with their first concert in fifteen years on May 11 at the Yoyogi National Gymnasium. It was Yoshii who initiated the reunion when he emailed the other members about it after seeing The Rolling Stones perform in London in 2013. Their first new song, "Alright", debuted on the radio on February 10, 2016. "Alright" is included as the B-side on their first single since reuniting, "Tower of Sand" ("Suna no Tō"), which was released on October 19, 2016. The year saw them perform 42 concerts to over 360,000 people. The band was honored with a Special Award at the 58th Japan Record Awards in 2016, and the Best Respect Artist award at the 2017 Space Shower Music Awards for their influence and achievements in music.

In celebration of the 25th anniversary of their major label debut, the self-cover album The Yellow Monkey is Here. New Best was released on May 21, 2017. It features new recordings of the first sixteen songs from 2013's Yemon -Fan's Best Selection-, the track list of which was voted on by fans. A special edition of the album includes a second CD of the new song "Rosanna". The Yellow Monkey recorded a cover of David Bowie's "Ziggy Stardust" released exclusively on Amazon.co.jp. It was first released digitally on September 13, 2017, with a made-to-order 7-inch record coupled with a live recording of the same song released on January 8, 2018. A song called "Stars" was released digitally on October 27, 2017. "Horizon", the theme song of the film Ototoki, was released digitally on November 29 as the final part of three consecutive monthly releases. On December 9 and 10, The Yellow Monkey performed at the Tokyo Dome for the first time in 17 years.

In October 2018, it was announced that the band had signed with Atlantic/Warner Music Japan. The Yellow Monkey's catalog was made available on digital services worldwide on November 9. That same day, the new song "Ladybug" ("Tentomushi") was released. The digital song "I Don't Know" was released on January 25, 2019. Their tenth studio album and first in 19 years, 9999, was released on April 17 and supported by a lengthy nationwide arena tour from April to September. It was named Album of the Year at the 61st Japan Record Awards. On August 6, the band performed a surprise concert at Shibuya La Mama, where they played their first gig almost 30 years earlier, limited to 250 people. In celebration of their 30th anniversary, they released an expanded version of 9999 and planned four dome concerts between December 28, 2019 and April 5, 2020. However, the April 4 and 5 Tokyo Dome concerts were cancelled due to the COVID-19 pandemic in Japan. Four additional anniversary dome concerts were held between November 3 and December 28, and were released on home video in March 2021. The band's first live album in over 20 years, Live Loud, was released in February with a track list decided by fan votes.

All four members of The Yellow Monkey contributed to the March 2023 single "Bye-Bye Show" by the idol group Bish. Yoshii wrote and produced the song, while the other three perform on the track.

Members 
 – vocals, guitar
 – guitar, backing vocals
 – bass, backing vocals
 – drums

Discography

Studio albums 
 Bunched Birth (July 21, 1991)
 The Night Snails and Plastic Boogie (June 21, 1992), Oricon Albums Chart Peak Position: No. 79
 Experience Movie (March 1, 1993) No. 80
 Jaguar Hard Pain 1944〜1994 (March 1, 1994) No. 28
 Smile (February 1, 1995) No. 4
 Four Seasons (November 1, 1995) No. 1
 Sicks (January 22, 1997) No. 1
 Punch Drunkard (March 4, 1998) No. 1
 8 (July 26, 2000) No. 2
 9999 (April 17, 2019) No. 3

Compilation albums 
 Triad Years Act 1 The Very Best of The Yellow Monkey (December 7, 1996) No. 2
 Triad Years Act 2 The Very Best of The Yellow Monkey (April 19, 1997) No. 2
 The Yellow Monkey Single Collection (December 10, 1998) No. 10
 Triad Years Act I & II The Very Best of The Yellow Monkey (March 1, 2001) No. 25
 Golden Years Singles 1996-2001 (June 13, 2001) No. 2
 The Yellow Monkey Mother of All The Best (December 8, 2004) No. 5
  No. 2
 30 Years 30 Hits (January 8, 2022, streaming only)

Other albums 
 Triad Complete Box (December 10, 1997, box set) No. 14
 So Alive (May 26, 1999, live album) No. 4
 This is For You ~ The Yellow Monkey Tribute Album (December 9, 2009, tribute album) No. 6
 Complete Sicks (January 22, 2010) No. 6
 The Yellow Monkey is Here. New Best (May 21, 2017, self-cover album) No. 1
 9999+1 (December 4, 2019) No. 2
 Live Loud (February 3, 2021, live album) No. 1
 The Night Snails and Plastic Boogie <Deluxe Edition> (April 25, 2022) No. 5
 The Yellow Monkey Vinyl Album Collection -Major Debut 30th Anniversary Edition- (January 11, 2023, box set)

Singles 
 "Romantist Taste" (May 21, 1992)
 , Oricon Singles Chart Peak Position: No. 49
  No. 97
  No. 59
 "Love Communication" (January 21, 1995) No. 29
  No. 34
  No. 19
  No. 9
 "Jam/Tactics" (February 29, 1996) No. 6
 "Spark" (July 10, 1996) No. 3
  No. 3
 "Love Love Show" (April 19, 1997) No. 4
 "Burn" (July 24, 1997) No. 2
  No. 1
  No. 15
 "Sugar Fix" (August 21, 1998) No. 5
 "My Winding Road" (October 21, 1998) No. 5
 "So Young" (March 3, 1999) No. 5
  No. 4
  No. 9
 "Shock Hearts" (April 5, 2000) No. 3
  No. 6
 "Brilliant World" (November 1, 2000) No. 5
  No. 3
 "Romantist Taste 2012" (October 10, 2012) No. 5
  No. 2

Other singles 
 "Alright" (February 12, 2017, fan club only)
 
 "Ziggy Stardust" (September 13, 2017, Amazon.co.jp only)
 "Stars" (October 27, 2017)
 "Horizon" (November 29, 2017)
 
 "I Don't Know" (January 25, 2019)
 "Dandan" (October 30, 2019)

Home videos 
 
 Cherry Blossom Revolution -Live at Budokan- (July 21, 1995)
 Clips Video Collection 1992〜1996 (March 30, 1996)
 True Mind Tour '95-'96 For Season: In Motion (October 21, 1996)
 Blue Film (November 1, 1997)
 Red Tape (December 3, 1997)
 Purple Disc (December 17, 1997)
 
 Clips 2 Video Collection 1996〜1998 (November 18, 1998)
 
 Jaguar Hard Pain Live '94 (December 10, 1999)
 Spring Tour (December 9, 2000), Oricon DVDs Chart Peak Position: No. 25
 Clips 3 Video Collection 1999〜2001 (March 14, 2001) No. 11
 The Yellow Monkey Clip Box (December 8, 2004) No. 9
 The Yellow Monkey Live Box (December 8, 2004) No. 15
 The Yellow Monkey Live at Tokyo Dome (December 28, 2004) No. 13
  No. 82
  No. 6
  No. 161
  No. 241
 True Mind "Naked" (October 21, 2012) No. 4
 Red Tape "Naked" (December 3, 2012) No. 5
  No. 7, Oricon Blu-rays Chart Peak Position: No. 102
 The Yellow Monkey Super Japan Tour 2016 -Saitama Super Arena 2016.7.10- (October 19, 2016) No. 1, No. 1
 The Yellow Monkey Live Box (March 21, 2018) No. 13
  No. 40, No. 3 (deluxe), 143 (regular)
 The Yellow Monkey Super Big Egg 2017 (August 2, 2019) No. 3, No. 4
 The Yellow Monkey 30th Anniversary Live -Dome Special- 2020.11.3 (March 10, 2021) No. 21, No. 35
 30th Anniversary The Yellow Monkey Super Dome Tour Box (March 10, 2021) No. 4, No. 2
 Spring Tour "Naked" (May 11, 2022) No. 3
 The Yellow Monkey Super Japan Tour 2019 -Grateful Spoonful- Complete Box (July 20, 2022) No. 3

Video games
Perfect Performer: The Yellow Monkey (July 1, 1999, PlayStation)
The Yellow Monkey: Trancemission VJ Remix (April 14, 2000, PlayStation)

Awards

References

External links

 The Yellow Monkey Official website
 Kazuya Yoshii Official website
 Yoichi Hirose Official website
 Eiji Kikuchi Official website
 Hideaki Kikuchi Official website

Atlantic Records artists
Nippon Columbia artists
Japanese hard rock musical groups
Japanese alternative rock groups
Japanese glam rock musical groups
Musical groups established in 1988
Musical groups disestablished in 2004
Musical groups reestablished in 2016
Musical groups from Tokyo
Sibling musical groups